Kelly S. King  (born September 12, 1948 in Raleigh, North Carolina) is Executive Chairman of Truist Financial, formerly BB&T Corporation.

Early life and education 
King worked on his family's tobacco farm during childhood, located in Zebulon to the East of Raleigh. During high school, he was a salesman for clothing and vacuums. He then received a Bachelor of Business Administration, East Carolina University, Greenville, North Carolina, followed by an M.B.A. from the same institution. He also attended Stonier Graduate School of Banking at Rutgers University, Newark, New Jersey.

Career 

King began his career in BB&T's Management Development Program in 1972 and has served in many roles, including manager of its Central and Metropolitan regions, Raleigh city executive, Charlotte business services manager, Statesville consumer lending manager, and banking manager for BB&T's branch network. In January 2009, he was named a director of the Federal Reserve Bank of Richmond. Before his appointment as CEO on 1 January 2009, King was BB&T's chief operating officer from 2004 to 2008. In December 2012, BB&T announced that they eliminated a provision in King's contract that would have required him to step down when he turns 65, effectively keeping him as CEO for three more years. He was named Banker of the Year 2015 by American Banker magazine. In 2019, regulators approved the merger of BB&T and SunTrust, creating a new institution to be called Truist. King remains CEO and chairman of Truist. In October 2019, the Triad Business Journal named him one of the year's "Power Players" in business.

Compensation 
During his first year as  CEO of BB&T in 2009, King earned a total compensation of $4,469,300.

Personal life 
A resident of North Carolina, King is Christian.

References 

East Carolina University alumni
American chief executives of financial services companies
Living people
1948 births
American chief operating officers